Tau John Tokwepota (born 25 June 1956) is a Papua New Guinean long-distance runner. He competed in the marathon at the 1976 Summer Olympics and the 1984 Summer Olympics.

References

External links
 

1956 births
Living people
Athletes (track and field) at the 1976 Summer Olympics
Athletes (track and field) at the 1984 Summer Olympics
Papua New Guinean male long-distance runners
Papua New Guinean male marathon runners
Olympic athletes of Papua New Guinea
Athletes (track and field) at the 1982 Commonwealth Games
Commonwealth Games competitors for Papua New Guinea
Place of birth missing (living people)